The Austin Sessions is an album by Kris Kristofferson, released on Atlantic Records in 1999 (see 1999 in music). It features stripped-down versions of Kristofferson's most famous material, including "Me and Bobby McGee", "Sunday Mornin' Comin' Down" and "Help Me Make It Through the Night". Several well-known artists contributed vocals to the album, including Steve Earle, Jackson Browne, Matraca Berg, Vince Gill, Marc Cohn, Alison Krauss, Catie Curtis and Mark Knopfler.

Track listing
All tracks written by Kris Kristofferson except where noted.

 "Me and Bobby McGee" (Kristofferson, Fred Foster) – 4:31
 "Sunday Mornin' Comin' Down" – 5:20
 "For the Good Times" – 3:59
 "The Silver Tongued Devil and I" – 3:37
 "Help Me Make It Through the Night" – 4:10
 "Loving Her Was Easier (Than Anything I'll Ever Do Again)" – 5:18
 "To Beat the Devil" – 4:30
 "Who's to Bless and Who's to Blame" – 3:29
 "Why Me" – 2:58
 "Nobody Wins" – 4:05
 "The Pilgrim, Chapter 33" – 2:41
 "Please Don't Tell Me How the Story Ends" – 2:38

Personnel
Kris Kristofferson - vocals, acoustic guitar, harmonica 
 Mike Baird - drums
 Matraca Berg - harmony vocals
 Jackson Browne - harmony vocals
 Stephen Bruton - mandolin
 Marc Cohn - harmony vocals
 Jim Cox - keyboards, accordion
 Catie Curtis - harmony vocals
 Steve Earle - harmony vocals
 Paul Franklin - steel guitar
 Vince Gill - harmony vocals
 Alison Krauss - harmony vocals
 Fred Mollin - harmonica, bass drum, 12-string guitar
 Larry Paxton - bass, guitar, mandolin
 Joe Spivey - fiddle
 John Willis - acoustic guitar, electric guitar, slide guitar, resonator guitar

Charts

References

Kris Kristofferson albums
1999 albums
Atlantic Records albums